Andriy Nemchaninov (born 27 November 1966) is a Russian athlete. He competed in the men's shot put at the 1992 Summer Olympics.

References

1966 births
Living people
Athletes (track and field) at the 1992 Summer Olympics
Russian male shot putters
Olympic athletes of the Unified Team
Place of birth missing (living people)
CIS Athletics Championships winners